The 2016 Bhutan National League was the fifth season of the national football competition in Bhutan, having replaced the A-Division (Bhutan) in 2013. Again, the Thimphu League provides the qualifiers from Thimphu, with the top three teams in that competition being awarded places in the National League alongside three regional teams.

Thimphu League

Format and rules
The Thimphu League is a regional competition for teams from Thimphu. the competition consists of seven teams, each plays the others twice – home and away – for a total of 12 games each, over 14 game weeks. 3 points are awarded for a win, 1 point for a draw and 0 points for a loss. The league table is decided firstly on points won, then on goal difference and finally on total goals scored if the previous two are equal. The first three teams automatically qualify for the National league, the bottom two teams compete in relegation playoffs with the top two teams from the B-Division for two places in the next season's competition.

Competing clubs

 Bhutan U-17s
 Druk Pol
 Druk Stars
 Druk United
 Tensung
 Terton
 Thimphu
 Thimphu City

Season summary
The 2016 season of the Thimphu League, previously called the Bhutan A-Division, started on April 3, 2016 and ended on June 19. Terton are defending champions and the competition has been expanded from 7 teams in 2015 with the addition of Tensung and Bhutan U-17s following the relegation of Dzongree. The 2016 Thimphu league was opened with a friendly match organised by the Bhutan Football Federation between the Legends, a team of ex-national team players, including Nado, a sixty-five year old player who represented Bhutan throughout the eighties and nineties, and the Young Stars, the national team, with the Young Stars winning 5–4.

League table

Results

National league

Format and rules
The competition consists of six teams competing for the national league championship, the winner of which gains a place in the next season's. AFC Cup. Each plays the others twice – home and away – for a total of 10 games each, over 10 game weeks. 3 points are awarded for a win, 1 point for a draw and 0 points for a loss. the league table is decided firstly on points won, then on goal difference and finally on total goals scored if the previous two are equal. There is no promotion or relegation from this league.

Teams

A total of six teams competed in the league: three teams representing Thimphu, who qualified as a result of their final positions in the 2015 A-Division, and three teams representing other districts.
 Bhutan Clearing (representing Chukha District)
 Druk United (third place in the 2016 A-Division)
 Paro United (representing Paro District)
 Thimphu (runners-up in the 2016 A-Division)
 Thimphu City (winners of the 2016 A-Division)
 Ugyen Academy (representing Punakha District)

League table

Results

References

Bhutan National League seasons
Bhutan
Bhutan
1